Festuca elatior L. is the former name of a species of grass. Because of confusion in the application of this name, it was rejected by the International Botanical Congress.

 Festuca elatior sensu lectotype is now a synonym of Festuca arundinacea Schreb.
 Festuca elatior auct. Amer. is now a synonym of Festuca pratensis Huds.

References

elatior